Charles Teamboueon (6 December 1939 – 11 February 2013) was a New Caledonian professional football player and manager.

Career
Teamboueon won the New Caledonia Super Ligue in 1965 and 1966 with Frégate de Saint-Louis as a player-coach. In December 1966, he joined Gazélec Ajaccio, uniting with fellow New Caledonians Moïse Gorendiawé and Marc-Kanyan Case. The club won the Championnat de France amateur in 1968 and were promoted to the second professional division. Tamboueon finished his career in 1972 after several injuries and operations to the knee.

Teamboueon was selected for the first time in team of New Caledonia national team in 1966. He is a finalist of the Pacific Games 1966. Charles Teamboueon was part of the Olympic team representing France in the football tournament at the Olympic Summer Games 1968 in Mexico. He played in the group stage against the Guinea, against Mexico, scoring a goal in the thirtieth minute of the game and against Colombia, scoring a goal in the fifty-ninth minute of the game. He graduated at the quarter-final lost 3–1 to Japan, and scoring the only goal in the French thirty-second minute.

In the 1960s Teamboueon was a coach-player in the Frégate de Saint-Louis. After 27 years spent working with the same company in France, Teamboueon encountered several bureaucratic issues on his return to New Caledonia, finally returning for good in 2005 with his wife. In 2007, he coached the A.S. Mont-Dore.

On 11 February 2013 he died after a long battle with cancer.

Honours
Pacific Games: 1
 finalist: 1966
New Caledonia Championship: 2
 1965, 1966
New Caledonia Cup: 1
 finalist: 2007
Championnat de France amateur de football: 1
 1968

References

External links

1939 births
2013 deaths
People from North Province, New Caledonia
New Caledonian footballers
Association football forwards
New Caledonia international footballers
France international footballers
French footballers
New Caledonian football managers
French football managers
Olympic footballers of France
Footballers at the 1968 Summer Olympics
Gazélec Ajaccio players